The  and  are limited express train services in Japan operated by JR Kyushu which run from Miyazaki Airport station to Oita and the Sea Gaia service continues to Beppu and Hakata.

The Dream Nichirin overnight train service from Hakata and Miyazaki Airport was discontinued from the start of the revised timetable on March 12, 2011 in conjunction with the opening of the completed Kyushu shinkansen. In 2013 JR Kyushu began an irregular excursion train, Seven Stars in Kyushu, which offers occasional overnight service to Miyazaki as part of a longer tour.

References

Named passenger trains of Japan
Kyushu Railway Company
Railway services introduced in 1968
Railway services discontinued in 2011